Players and pairs who neither have high enough rankings nor receive wild cards may participate in a qualifying tournament held one week before the annual Wimbledon Tennis Championships.

Seeds

  Jonathan Canter /  Nduka Odizor (second round)
 n/a
  David Adams /  Ģirts Dzelde (qualified, Lucky losers)
  Bruce Derlin /  Steve Guy (second round)  Martin Laurendeau /  Fernando Roese (qualified)
  Alexis Hombrecher /  Mihnea-Ion Năstase (second round)  Henrik Holm /  Peter Nyborg (qualified)
  Mark Keil /  Dave Randall (second round)''
  Neil Borwick /  Andrew Kratzmann (qualified)
  Brent Haygarth /  Byron Talbot (qualified)

Qualifiers

  Neil Borwick /  Andrew Kratzmann
  Brent Haygarth /  Byron Talbot
  Byron Black /  T. J. Middleton
  Henrik Holm /  Peter Nyborg (qualified)
  Martin Laurendeau /  Fernando Roese

Lucky losers
  David Adams /  Ģirts Dzelde

Qualifying draw

First qualifier

Second qualifier

Third qualifier

Fourth qualifier

Fifth qualifier

External links

1991 Wimbledon Championships – Men's draws and results at the International Tennis Federation

Men's Doubles Qualifying
Wimbledon Championship by year – Men's doubles qualifying